The 15 cm schwere Feldhaubitze 36 or sFH 36 (German: "heavy field howitzer, model 36"), was a shortened lightweight version of the earlier 15 cm schwere Feldhaubitze 18 that was produced in limited numbers from 1938-1942 and used during World War II.

History 
In 1935 the army drafted a requirement for a lightened version of the 15 cm schwere Feldhaubitze 18 which could be towed by a single horse team in one piece.  After testing in 1938 a design from Rheinmetall was selected to meet the requirement.  The new design consisted of a shortened sFH 18 barrel with a prominent muzzle brake with four rows of 13 baffles and a split trail carriage made largely of light alloys.  The carriage had two pressed steel wheels with solid rubber tires and for travel the barrel could be disconnected from the hydro-pneumatic recoil system and pulled back to lie on top of the closed trails for towing.  A limber with a tow bar was provided for the horse team for towing.  The sFH 36 used the same separate loading cased charges and projectile as the sFH 18 and it used the same sliding-block breech as the sFH 18.  However, the sFH 36 used up to 7 bagged charges to vary velocity and range, while the sFH 18 used up to 8.  Production of the sFH 36 ceased in 1942 due to increased mechanization of the army, limited supplies of light alloys and the prioritization of their use for aircraft production.

sFH 18 and sFH 36 comparison

See also 
152 mm howitzer-gun M1937 (ML-20) – Soviet 152 mm howitzer
M114 155 mm howitzer - US howitzer of similar size

References

External links 
 https://en.valka.cz/topic/view/66993/15-cm-sFH-36

150 mm artillery
World War II field artillery
World War II artillery of Germany
Rheinmetall
World War II howitzers
Military equipment introduced in the 1930s